Harekala  is a village in the southern state of Karnataka, India. It is located in the Mangalore taluk of Dakshina Kannada district.

Demographics
 India census, Harekala had a population of 6,207 with 3,045 males and 3,162 females.

See also
 Mangalore
 Dakshina Kannada
 Districts of Karnataka

References

External links
 http://dk.nic.in/

Villages in Dakshina Kannada district
Localities in Mangalore